The Wuhan Cup is a biennial world championship contract bridge tournament for national mixed . It is contested every odd-number year under the auspices of the World Bridge Federation (WBF), alongside the Bermuda Bowl (Open), d'Orsi Bowl and Venice Cup and was inaugurated in 2019. The event took the name of the City of Wuhan who presented the trophy and will provide replicas for future editions.

Winner

Hosts
 2019: Wuhan, China
 2021: Salsomaggiore Terme, Italy

References

Contract bridge world competitions